Stigmatophora obraztsovi is a moth in the subfamily Arctiinae. It was described by Franz Daniel in 1951. It is found in Zhejiang, China.

References

Moths described in 1951
Lithosiini
Moths of Asia